Franck Montagny (born 5 January 1978) is a retired French professional racing driver. He briefly raced for the Super Aguri Formula One team in 2006.

Early career
Born in Feurs, Loire, Montagny started racing karts there in 1988, winning the cadet class in the French Karting Championship in 1992, and the National 1 class the following year.

He made his debut in cars in 1994, aged 16, promptly winning the French Renault Campus championship. The next two years were spent in Formula Renault, with finishes in fourth (the highest-finishing rookie that year) and sixth (despite missing half the season with multiple fractures obtained in an accident at Le Mans) respectively, before transferring up to French Formula Three in 1997 with the La Filière Martini team, debuting with another fourth place championship finish.

Formula Three breakthrough

Montagny had a breakthrough year in Formula Three in 1998, including a pole position at the Spa-Francorchamps race ahead of much more experienced drivers including Mark Webber, Luciano Burti, Enrique Bernoldi and Peter Dumbreck. He repeated the feat in the Zandvoort Masters in the Netherlands later that year, beating then German Formula Three champion Nick Heidfeld. He consistently outpaced long-time teammate Sébastien Bourdais and ended the season with 10 wins from 22 races, including 12 pole positions, finishing the championship as runner-up behind David Saelens.

Formula 3000 and sports cars

Montagny moved up to Formula 3000 in 1999, driving for the DAMS team which was falling from its peak by then. One podium finish at the Hungaroring was his main success; he totalled only 6 points and tenth place that season. He however ended the year with success in the Elf Masters Karting at Paris-Bercy.

A repeat of his unsuccessful year in Formula 3000 prompted a move to World Series by Nissan in 2001, signing for the Epsilon by Graff team. He won 8 races out of a possible 16, and beat Tomas Scheckter to the championship. He changed teams for 2002 to Racing Engineering, but was beaten into second place in the championship by Ricardo Zonta. He supplemented this with a sixth-place finish for Oreca at the Le Mans 24 hours.

Formula One

Renault and Jordan
Montagny returned to the World Series by Nissan in 2003 with Gabord Competicion, and secured his second championship title with nine victories, ahead of Heikki Kovalainen. This performance earned him a test with the Renault Formula One team, in which he impressed sufficiently to earn a contract as a test driver in 2003, moving up to become third driver during the 2004 & 2005 seasons. He did an impressive one-off for Jordan as third driver on the Friday of the 2005 European Grand Prix, clocking a quicker time than Narain Karthikeyan and Tiago Monteiro, the official Jordan drivers.

In mid-2004, as part of his Renault F1 testing duties, Montagny became the chief test and development driver for the new GP2 Series, which would be powered by Renault engines. Montagny was the first driver to take the wheel of the car, and along with former F1 driver and ex-Renault F1 tester and Friday driver Allan McNish, divided testing duties between them, before the GP2 Series was officially launched in 2005. Much of the success of the championship and the drivability of the car has been placed on the development skills of Montagny. This was further evidenced at the start of the 2006 GP2 Series season, when Montagny was called in to test for the newly created FMS International team, to aid them and their drivers in understanding the complexities of the car, at Circuit Ricardo Tormo, Valencia, Spain, where Montagny had put in hundreds of testing laps in his time with Renault F1.

Super Aguri

For 2006, Super Aguri took  Montagny on as third driver; however, he was promoted to full race driver in May after it was announced that Yuji Ide was to drop back into testing; Ide was demoted at the behest of the governing body who considered him insufficiently experienced for Formula One. Montagny hence competed in his first Grand Prix, the 2006 European Grand Prix on 7 May, qualifying last and retiring with a hydraulics problem. He did not finish his second race 2006 Spanish Grand Prix: after a great start, enabling him to gain 3 positions, he retired on lap 10 with a mechanical failure. It was third time lucky for him at the Monaco Grand Prix, when he finished the 78-lap race in 16th place, three laps behind the leader.

During the break between the British Grand Prix and the Canadian Grand Prix, Montagny was able to participate in the Le Mans 24 Hours, finishing second for Pescarolo Sport behind only the dominating Audi factory R10s.  He was the first active Formula One driver to also participate at Le Mans in the same year since Mark Blundell in 1995.

On 12 July, Super Aguri announced that Sakon Yamamoto would replace him from the German Grand Prix onwards. Montagny did not appear in his role as third driver for the next two weekends as only two Super Aguri SA06s were available but a third chassis was prepared during the summer break enabling him to reprise this role at the Turkish Grand Prix.

Toyota

Montagny tested for Toyota F1 in September 2006 at Silverstone. A month later, Toyota confirmed that he would join the team as test driver for the 2007 season, as Olivier Panis and Ricardo Zonta were leaving the team.  After spending 2007 as a test driver, Montagny left the team after a test at the Circuit de Catalunya in November. He was still interested in gaining a drive in F1, and had been linked with the Renault F1 team for the 2010 season, but Renault signed Vitaly Petrov.

After Formula One
Montagny competed in the final Champ Car World Series race, held at the Long Beach circuit on April 19, 2008. He finished second in his first appearance in a race in the United States, five seconds behind Australian Will Power. In June, he drove the Peugeot 908 HDi FAP at the 2008 24 Hours of Le Mans and finished in the third place with Ricardo Zonta and Christian Klien.

Montagny made his debut in the American Le Mans Series with Andretti Green Racing at the 2008 Northeast Grand Prix at Lime Rock Park in July 2008, driving an Acura ARX-01B.

He made his IndyCar Series debut in 2009 at the Indy Grand Prix of Sonoma at Infineon Raceway with Andretti Green Racing.

Superleague Formula
Montagny has signed up to drive the Girondins de Bordeaux entry in the Superleague Formula for the 2010 season.

Formula E
In May 2014, Andretti Autosport announced that Montagny would race for them in the inaugural season of the FIA Formula E Championship in 2014–15. He raced for the team in Beijing and Putrajaya, scoring a podium in Beijing and scoring 18 points overall in the two races. However, he was replaced in Punta del Este by Jean-Éric Vergne. It was not immediately known why, but Montagny later admitted that he tested positive for benzoylecgonine, a cocaine derivative after the Putrajaya ePrix. In March 2015, Montagny was given a two-year ban from racing, and was also disqualified from the Putrajaya race, in which he initially placed fifteenth.

Current life
Montagny now works as a pit lane summariser and expert for French television.

Racing record

Career summary

** Team standings
† Championship merged into the IndyCar Series after one race.
‡ Not Eligible for points

Sportscar racing

24 Hours of Le Mans results

Complete American Le Mans Series results

Complete International Formula 3000 results
(key)

Complete Formula One results
(key)

Complete A1 Grand Prix results
(key)

American open–wheel racing results
(key)

IndyCar Series

 1 Run on same day.
 2 Non-points-paying, exhibition race.

Superleague Formula
(key) (Races in italics indicate fastest lap)

 † Non-championship event.

Complete Formula E results
(key) (Races in bold indicate pole position; races in italics indicate fastest lap)

References

External links

 

1978 births
Living people
People from Feurs
French racing drivers
Formule Campus Renault Elf drivers
French Formula Three Championship drivers
French Formula One drivers
A1 Team France drivers
24 Hours of Le Mans drivers
Super Aguri Formula One drivers
International Formula 3000 drivers
IndyCar Series drivers
American Le Mans Series drivers
Superleague Formula drivers
European Le Mans Series drivers
FIA World Endurance Championship drivers
Formula E drivers
Doping cases in auto racing
French sportspeople in doping cases
Sportspeople from Loire (department)
Andretti Autosport drivers
British Formula Three Championship drivers
A1 Grand Prix drivers
Champ Car drivers
Supercars Championship drivers
DAMS drivers
Graff Racing drivers
Oreca drivers
Racing Engineering drivers
Peugeot Sport drivers
OAK Racing drivers
Audi Sport drivers
Pescarolo Sport drivers
La Filière drivers
Forsythe Racing drivers
Level 5 Motorsports drivers
AFS Racing drivers
Kelly Racing drivers